Golz is a surname. Notable people with the surname include:

Marianne Golz (1895–1943), Austrian opera singer and World War II resistance member
Richard Golz (born 1968), German football goalkeeper
Rolf Gölz (born 1962), German cyclist
Werner Golz (1933-1974), German chess player